Jacqueline Schultz is a film and television actress.

Early years 
Schultz was born in Queens, New York. As a teenager, she wanted a singing career, specifically singing opera. When she was 13, she took vocal and acting lessons. She was active in musical productions and recitals as a student at Northport High School. She went from Northport to Hofstra University, where she graduated with a degree in music.While at Hofstra, she performed in musical theater and classical opera and sang contemporary music.

Career
Schultz's work on stage included acting in summer stock tours of productions that included Cabaret and A Funny Thing Happened on the Way to the Forum. She also made television commercials and worked as a waitress.

In addition to her recurring roles on two television soap operas — as Dee Stewart on As the World Turns (1979–1982); and as the last Patti Tate on Search for Tomorrow (1985–1986) — Schultz has appeared in over twenty-five other television productions, including a brief appearance on the Star Trek: Deep Space Nine episode "Extreme Measures" as Jessica Sloan.

Beginning on January 7, 1986, Schultz portrayed Catherine Simms in the off-Broadway comedy The Foreigner after having been a standby for the play. Her other off-Broadway credits include Pygmalion and Hay Fever.

Off-stage, Schultz was the founding artistic director for Garbeau's Dinner Theatre, where she directed more than 30 productions in five years. She was resident director of the Sacramento Theatre Company and work with Sonoma's Sierra Repertory Theatre.

She has also appeared in three films.

Personal life
Schultz was married to actor Larry Bryggman, whom she met while on working on As the World Turns.

Filmography

References

External links

Year of birth missing (living people)
American film actresses
American soap opera actresses
American television actresses
Living people
21st-century American women